Meet Me in the Bathroom may refer to:

"Meet Me in the Bathroom", a song by The Strokes from their 2003 album Room on Fire 
Meet Me in the Bathroom (book), by Lizzy Goodman, 2017